North Dakota's at-large congressional district is the sole congressional district for the state of North Dakota. Based on size, it is the eighth largest congressional district in the nation.

The district is currently represented by Kelly Armstrong.

History

The district was first created when North Dakota achieved statehood on November 2, 1889, electing a single member. Following the 1900 Census the state was allocated two seats, both of whom were elected from an at large district. Following the 1910 Census a third seat was gained, with the legislature drawing three separate districts. The third district was eliminated after the 1930 Census. After the third seat was lost, North Dakota returned to electing two members at-large (statewide).

Following the 1960 Census two separate districts were created. In 1970, the second district was eliminated following the 1970 Census and a single at-large district was created. Since 1972, North Dakota has retained a single congressional district.

List of members representing the district

1889–1913: One seat, then two 

From 1889 to 1903, there was one seat, elected at-large statewide. In 1903 a second at-large seat was added, lasting until 1913.

1913–1933: Districts only 

1933–1963: Two seats 

In 1933, following the 1930 census, the delegation was reduced to two seats and the districts were eliminated in favor of a pair of at-large districts, lasting until 1963.

1963–1973: Districts again 

1973–present: One seat 

In 1973, following the 1970 census, the delegation was reduced to one seat, represented statewide by an at-large district.

Recent statewide results

Electoral history

2006

2008

2010

2012

2014

2016

2018

2020

2022

References

Election statistics compiled by the Clerk to the House of Representatives; Michael J. Dubin, "United States Congressional Elections 1788-1997" (McFarland, 1998).

 Congressional Biographical Directory of the United States 1774–present

At-large
At-large United States congressional districts
1889 establishments in North Dakota